Minuscule 877 (in the Gregory-Aland numbering), ε204 (von Soden), is a 12th-century Greek minuscule manuscript of the New Testament on parchment. It has complex contents.

Description 

The codex contains the text of the four Gospels on 218 parchment leaves (size ). The text is written in two columns per page, 25 lines per page.
According to F. H. A. Scrivener it is "a splendid codex".

There is also a division according to the Ammonian Sections, with references to the Eusebian Canons.

According to Hermann von Soden it has lectionary markings.

Text 
The Greek text of the codex is a representative of the Byzantine text-type. Hermann von Soden classified it to the textual family Kx. Kurt Aland did not place it in any Category.
According to the Claremont Profile Method it represents textual family Kx in Luke 1 and Luke 20. In Luke 10 no profile was made. It creates textual pair with 439.

History 

The manuscript is dated by the colophon to the year 1197. It was written by a monk, Athanasius, at the suggestion of Johannicius.

The manuscript was added to the list of New Testament manuscripts by Scrivener (694e), Gregory (877e). Gregory saw it in 1886.

Currently the manuscript is housed at the Vatican Library (Gr. 2290), in Rome.

See also 

 List of New Testament minuscules
 Biblical manuscript
 Textual criticism
 Minuscule 875

References

Further reading

External links 
 

Greek New Testament minuscules
12th-century biblical manuscripts
Manuscripts of the Vatican Library